Lawrence Lowell Williams is an American record producer, composer, arranger, and multi-instrumentalist. He is proficient on the keyboards, saxophone, flute, and clarinet. Williams began his musical career in the 1970s, and has since established himself as a prominent figure in the music industry. He regularly toured and recorded with Al Jarreau for over 3 decades and also was a musician on Michael Jackson's albums Off The Wall, Thriller, and Bad.

Early life 
Williams was born in Kansas City, Kansas and grew up in Overland Park. He began learning the clarinet at age 8, under the influence of his father who played the saxophone.

Williams went on to study music at New Mexico State University and later transferred to Indiana University School of Music in 1969. While at university, Williams began playing with visiting orchestras, including those of Glen Campbell, Henry Mancini, and Johnny Mathis.

While studying at Indiana University, he met Jerry Hey and Kim Hutchcroft, who would later become members of jazz-fusion band Seawind.
He decided to leave university and focus to work full-time with Seawind in Hawaii.

A notable part of the band's sound was the "Seawind Horns" (Williams with trumpeter Jerry Hey, and sax and flute player Kim Hutchcroft).

Seawind caught the attention of drummer-producer Harvey Mason. He encouraged the group to move to Los Angeles where they quickly established a regular gig at the club The Baked Potato.

Career 
In LA, the band was noticed by producer and arranger Quincy Jones. This led to Williams and the other members of the Seawind Horns becoming studio musicians for Jones himself and several Jones’ productions such as George Benson, Brothers Johnson and Michael Jackson.

He has further recorded with Christopher Cross, David Crosby, Helen Reddy, Lee Ritenour, Lionel Richie, Mezzoforte, Michael Bolton, Michael Franks, Minnie Riperton, Natalie Cole, Olivia Newton-John, Pat Benatar, Patrice Rushen, Paul Young, Pink Floyd, Randy Crawford, Randy Newman, Ray Parker Jr., Richard Marx, Rick Astley, Roberta Flack, Sheena Easton, Simply Red and Stevie Nicks among others.
Williams played tenor saxophone, flute and keyboards on Michael Jackson's album Thriller and is featured on keyboards and sax synth solo on “Speed Demon” from the album Bad .

Discography 

 1970 — Crow By Crow - Crow
 1970 — Same Old Story - Blodwyn Pig
 1976 — Seawind - Seawind
 1976 — Earthmover - Harvey Mason
 1976 — Like A Seabird in the Wind - Olomana
 1977 — Finger Paintings - Earl Klugh
 1977 — Agora - Paulinho Da Costa
 1977 — Funk in a Mason Jar - Harvey Mason
 1977 — Window a Child - Seawind
 1978 — Blam! - Brothers Johnson
 1978 — Single - Bill Champlin
 1978 — Street Player - Rufus & Chaka Khan
 1978 — Patrice - Patrice Rushen
 1978 — Waiting for the rain - James Vincent
 1978 — Heartbreaker - Dolly Parton
 1978 — All Fly Home - Al Jarreau
 1978 — Other Peoples Rooms - Mark Almond
 1978 — Kenji Shock - Kenji Omura
 1978 — Songbird - Barbra Streisand
 1978 — Rudy Copeland - Rudy Copeland
 1979 — Take It Home - B.B King
 1979 — Minnie - Minnie Riperton
 1979 — Future Now - Pleasure
 1979 — Realce - Gilberto Gil
 1979 — Poses - Alain Chamfort
 1979 — Feel The Night - Lee Ritnour
 1979 — Masterjam - Rufus & Chaka
 1979 — Follow The Rainbow - George Duke
 1979 — If The Shoe Fits - Ronnie Dyson
 1979 — A Brazilian Love Affair - George Duke
 1979 — The Third Album - Paul Jabara
 1979 — Levitation - The Floaters
 1979 — Realce - Gilberto Gil
 1979 — The World Within - Stix Hooper
 1979 — Branda Russell - Brenda Russell
 1979 — The Glow - Bonnie Raitt
 1979 — Runnin' To Your Love - Eddie Henderson
 1979 — Double or Nothing - Lani Hall
 1979 — J Michael Reed - J Michael Reed
 1979 — You've Got It - Baby'O
 1979 — Off The Wall - Michael Jackson
 1980 — Bi Coastal - Peter Allen
 1980 — Give Me The Night - George Benson
 1980 — Light Up The Night - The brothers Johnson
 1980 — Candle - Heatwave
 1980 — My Babe - Roy Buchanan
 1980 — Special Things - Pleasure
 1980 — Lady T - Teena Marie
 1980 — Hold On - High Inergy
 1980 — Faces - Earth Wind & Fire
 1980 — 21 At 33 - Elton John
 1980 — Jeff Kutash And The Dancin' Machine - Jeff Kutash And The Dancin' Machine
 1980 — Supercharged - Tavares
 1980 — Better Days - The Blackbyrds
 1980 — Magnificent Madness -* John Klemmer
 1980 — Shine - Average White Band
 1980 — Larsen Feiten Band - Larsen Feiten Band
 1980 — John & Arthur Simms - John & Arthur Simms
 1980 — Tony Comer & Crosswinds - Tony Comer & Crosswinds
 1981 — Labor Of Love - Detroit Spinners
 1981 — Wall To Wall - Rene & Angela
 1981 — Precious Time - Pat Benatar
 1981 — By All Means - Alphonse Mouzon
 1981 — Breakin' Away - Al Jarreau
 1981 — Yellowjackets - Yellowjackets
 1981 — Camouflage - Rufus & Chaka Khan
 1981 — What Cha Gonna Do For Me - Chaka Khan
 1981 — Galaxian - Jeff Lorber Fusion
 1981 — The Dude - Quincy Jones
 1981 — All This Way - Patty Brard
 1981 — I Like Your Style - Jermaine Jackson
 1981 — Straight Ahead - Sheree Brown
 1981 — Looking Forward - Bob Bailey
 1982 — Dream On - George Duke
 1982 — Distant Lover - Alphonse Mouzon
 1982 — The Music - Sheree Brown
 1982 — Retro Active - Robert Kraft
 1982 — Dream On - George Duke
 1982 — Rit/2 - Lee Ritenour
 1982 — The Dukes Bugatti & Musker - The Dukes
 1982 — Incognito - Spyro Gyra
 1982 — Wild Things Run Fast - Joni Mitchell
 1982 — Thriller - Michael Jackson
 1982 — Lift Me Up - Herbie Hancock
 1982 — Hey Ricky - Melissa Manchester
 1982 — Bobbi Walker - Bobbi Walker
 1982 — Shangri-La - Toshiyuki Honda
 1982 — Step Into The Funk - Alphonse Mouzon
 1983 — Bet Cha Say That To All The Girls - Sister Sledge
 1983 — Emergency - Melissa Manchester
 1983 — Bodies And Souls - The Manhattan Transfer
 1983 — Trouble In Paradise - Randy Newman
 1983 — Continuation - Philip Bailey
 1983 — Attitude - Stevie Woods
 1983 — Girl At Her Volcano - Rickie Lee Jones
 1983 — Guardian Of The Light - George Duke
 1983 — It's All Your Night - James Ingram
 1983 — Friedns - Larry Carlton
 1983 — The Front - The Front
 1983 — Old Fool Back on Earth - Michel Colombier
 1983 — Kleiton & Kledir - Kleiton & Kledir
 1983 — Hurt Me Baby me write Bad Checks - Rick Dees
 1984 — Give My Regards To Broad Street - Paul McCartney
 1984 — Half The Effort Twice The Effect - Peter Cupples
 1984 — Banded Together - Lee Ritenour
 1984 — I've Got The Cure - Stephanie Mills
 1984 — So Romantic - Evelynb King
 1984 — A Private Heaven - Sheena Easton
 1984 — Human Racing - Nik Kershaw
 1984 — Don't Look Any Further - Dennis Edwards
 1984 — Self Control - Laura Branigan
 1984 — Patti Austin - Patti Austin
 1984 — Love Talk - Kimiko Kasai
 1984 — Mancha De Dende Nao Sai - Moraes Moreira
 1984 — Call of the Wild - Vicot Feldman's Generation Band
 1985 — Durrell Coleman - Durell Coleman
 1985 — Mahvelous! - Billy Crystal
 1985 — In London - Al Jarreau
 1985 — Warming Up to the Ice Age - John Hiatt
 1985 — Hold Me - Laura Branigan
 1985 — Maisha - Sadao Watanabe
 1985 — Mathematics - Melissa Manchester
 1985 — The Heart of the Matter - Kenny Rogers
 1985 — Soul Kiss - Olivia Newton-John
 1985 — Unguarded - Amy Grant
 1985 — Eaten Alive - Diana Ross
 1985 — Magic - Four Tops
 1985 — Medals - Russ Taff
 1985 — Nightshift - Commodores
 1985 — West of Broadway - Albert Fortis
 1985 — Silk & Steel - 5 Star
 1986 — Earth Run - Lee Ritenour
 1986 — Headed For The Future - Neil Diamond
 1986 — Fahrenheit - Toto
 1986 — Without Walls - Michael Sembello
 1986 — David Foster - David Foster
 1986 — August - Eric Clapton
 1986 — Rod Stewart - Rod Stewart
 1987 — Everlasting - Natalie Cole
 1987 — Richard Marx - Richard Marx
 1987 — Love Changes - Kashif
 1987 — No Protection - Starship
 1987 — Bad - Michael Jackson
 1987 — Hai Hai - Roger Hodgson
 1987 — Discovery - Larry Carlton
 1987 — Watch Out! - Patrice Rushen
 1987 — Yauretê - Milton Nascimento
 1987 — What If - What If
 1987 — Say It Again - Jermaine Stewart
 1987 — This Time - Al Jarreau
 1987 — After Dark - Ray Parker Jr
 1987 — Portrait - Lee Ritenour
 1987 — Reservation For Two - Dionne
 1988 — What Up Dog ? - Was (Not Wass)
 1988 — Other Roads - Boz Scaggs
 1988 — Back Of My Mind - Christopher Cross
 1988 — Brian Wilson - Brian Wilson
 1988 — The Lover in Me - Sheena Easton
 1988 — In the City of Angels - Jon Anderson
 1988 — Festival - Lee Ritenour
 1988 — Till i loved You - Barbra Streisand
 1988 — Desiree - Desiree Coleman
 1988 — Nothing But the Truth - Ruben Blades
 1988 — Rock Solid - Commodores
 1988 — Life in the Modern World - The Crusaders
 1988 — Night After Night - George duke
 1989 — Back on the Block - Quincy Jones
 1989 — Repeat Offender - Richard Max
 1989 — Larger Than Life - Jody Watley
 1989 — Cries And Whispers - Robert Hart
 1989 — A New Flame - Simply Red
 1989 — Spellhound - Joe Sample
 1990 — Everything but the Girl - The Language of Life
 1990 — Other Voices - Paul Young
 1990 — Get Here - Brenda Russell
 1990 — Ashas to Ashes - Joe Sample
 1990 — A View 3rd Street - Jude Cole
 1990 — Summer Nights - Marlene and Seawind
 1991 — Better Love - Mezzoforte
 1991 — Free - Rick Astley
 1991 — Future Street - Pages
 1991 — Carry On - Patti Austin
 1991 — Fortissimo - Mezzoforte
 1991 — Prince of Darkness - Big Daddy
 1992 — Rockinghorse - Alannah Myles
 1992 — Vivienne McKone - Vivienne McKone
 1992 — Three Wishes - Spyro Gyra
 1992 — Lynch Mob - Lynch Lob
 1992 — Go West - Indian Summer
 1992 — Snapshot - George Duke
 1993 — No Strings - Sheena Easton
 1993 — Jungle Fever - Neil Larsen
 1993 — Keep On - 10 Degrees
 1993 — Soul Talkin' - Brenda Russell
 1993 — Memphis Bound - Bryan Lee
 1994 — Baby I Love Your Way - Big Mountain
 1994 — It's Lewis - Lewis Cowdrey
 1994 — Braille Blues - Bryan Lee
 1995 — Illusions - George Duke
 1995 — Larry & Lee - Lee Ritenour & Larry Carlton
 1995 — Q's Jook Joint - Quincy Jones
 1995 — Remember - Seawind
 1995 — Are My Ears On Wrong - Jakko
 1995 — In My Lifetime - Neil Diamond
 1997 — Down to Earth - Nichelle Nichols
 1997 — Being There - Wilco
 1997 — Shapes And Patterns - Swing Out Sister
 1997 — Eros - Eros Ramazzotti
 1997 — Only You - Pauline Wilson
 1998 — This Is Jazz - George Duke
 1998 — This Is Love - Lee Ritneour
 1998 — A Place in the Sun - Lit
 1999 — Snowbound - Fourplay
 1999 — A New Standard - Steve Tyrell
 1999 — Roulette Girl - Mary Prankster
 2000 — My Kind of Christmas - Christina Aguilera
 2000 — Somebody Loves You - Bob & Pauline Wilson
 2000 — Brian Wilson - Brian Wilson
 2000 — Fingerprints - Larry Carlton
 2001 — Bad For Me - Dee Dee Bridgewater
 2001 — Collection - Tracy Chapman
 2001 — Tribute - Pauline Wilson
 2001 — On The Way To Love - Patti Austin
 2001 — Deep into It - Larry Carlton
 2002 — Be Not Nobody - Vanessa Carlton
 2002 — I'm Right There - Samantha Mumba
 2002 — All I Got - Al Jarreau
 2004 — The Dana Owens Album - Queen Latifah
 2004 — Accentuate The Positive - Al Jarreau
 2005 — Real Illusions — Reflections - Steve Vai
 2005 — PCD - The Pussycat Dolls
 2005 — World of Brazil - Lee Ritenour
 2008 — Dukey Treat - George Duke
 2009 — Reunion - Seawind

References

External links
 
 
 

Interviews
 Interview with Larry Williams on Yuzu Melodies (Archived)

Living people
Year of birth missing (living people)
Jazz fusion arrangers
American jazz saxophonists
American male saxophonists
21st-century American saxophonists
21st-century American male musicians
American male jazz musicians
Seawind (band) members
Lyle Lovett and His Large Band members